Boston Harbor (April 4, 1994 – March 9, 2021) was an American Thoroughbred racehorse. Bred by William T. Young's Overbrook Farm near Lexington, Boston Harbor was a son of Capote who won the 1996 Breeders' Cup Juvenile and was voted that year's U.S. Champion 2-Yr-Old Colt.

Trained by D. Wayne Lukas, Boston Harbor had a spectacular two-year-old season in which he won six times and finished second once in his seven starts. That year, his sweep of four Kentucky stakes races earned the colt an extra million dollars in bonus money. Ridden by future U.S. Racing Hall of Fame jockey, Jerry Bailey, Boston Harbor capped off 1996 with his fourth straight win, capturing the Breeders' Cup Juvenile, run that year at Woodbine Racetrack in Toronto, Ontario, Canada. His performances earned him 1996 U.S. Champion 2-Yr-Old Colt honors and his earnings of $1,928,605 set a new record for juveniles.

Boston Harbor raced only once at age three, finishing off the board. A severe leg injury ended his racing career and he was retired to stud duty at his owner's Overbrook Farm in Kentucky. In the fall of 2001, Boston Harbor was sent to breeders in Japan and is standing at the renowned Shizunai Stallion Station in Hokkaidō. Among Boston Harbor's notable progeny is the millionaire colt, Cafe Bostonian, and the multiple stakes winning millionaire filly, Healthy Addiction. He was also the damsire of Sealy Hill, who in 2007 was voted Canadian Horse of the Year.

Pedigree

References

1994 racehorse births
2021 racehorse deaths
Racehorses bred in Kentucky
Racehorses trained in the United States
Breeders' Cup Juvenile winners
Eclipse Award winners
Thoroughbred family 6-a